The 62nd Regiment of Foot may refer to:
60th (Royal American) Regiment of Foot, later the King's Royal Rifle Corps, known as the 62nd (Royal American) Regiment of Foot between 1755 and 1757
78th Fraser Highlanders, known as the 62nd Regiment of Foot for a short period in 1757
62nd (Wiltshire) Regiment of Foot, which existed between 1758 and its amalgamation to form the Wiltshire Regiment in 1881